Giuseppe "Giusva" Valerio Branca (born 10 January 1967, in Melito di Porto Salvo), is an Italian journalist, blogger and sportive manager. Now is team manager of Reggina 1914 football (italian second division)

Biography 
He attended the Liceo Scientifico Da Vinci the city of Reggio Calabria, and after a first experience at the University of Messina, attended his studies in the Faculty of Law at Magna Græcia University of Catanzaro, where he graduated in 1991. He exercises for 10 years, until 2004, as a lawyer, but in parallel, in addition to Basketball and Football to his great interest, a passion and profession of journalist, then that will be its main business. On 20 July 2006 married with Giada Katia Helen Romeo.

Professional activity 
In 1996, at age 29, he started working, becoming the leader, at the press office of Reggina Calcio, when Amaranth militate in series "A". Remains at the head of the press office of Reggina until 9 December 2002 he founded and directs the official magazine and website. In 2003 he worked as a journalist at Reggio TV, which is also managing director in 2005 and held the position of team manager of Purple basketball. In 2007 he became director of Telereggio, where he remained until 2008. From 2006 to present is editor and publisher of the online newspaper www.strill.it, which he founded with Raffaele Mortelliti. Always with Mortelliti, gives life to the publisher Urba Books and cultural festival Tabularasa, that every year, for 31 days in July, leading to Reggio Calabria characters like Paolo Mieli, Marco Paolini, Ferdinando Imposimato and Guido Crainz. On 3 June 2014 he was appointed president of the Viola Reggio Calabria. On 12 December 2014 was elected to the Council of the National Basketball League. On 14 July 2022 he was appointed Team manager of Reggina 1914 Football (Italian second division)

Works 

 Cacciatori di tigri. Il racconto del primo campionato della Reggina in serie A, Iiriti Editore
 Pallone e carri armati. Il calcio ai tempi della rivolta di Reggio Calabria, Ultra
 Reggio Calabria e la sua Reggina. Un intreccio di storia e destini 1964–2002, Laruffa - com Francesco Scarpino
 Idoli di carta. Quando il pallone si sgonfia comincia la vita: storie, passate e presenti, di undici ex-calciatori della Reggina, Laruffa
 Reggina (1914-2008). La storia, Laruffa
 Che anni quegli anni. La storia della viola basket, l'epopea della squadra che rimise assieme una città, Urba Books
 I giorni del ragno. Anni '70: l'Italia cambia pelle ed una tela mette assieme terrorismo, eversione, mafia e 'ndrangheta, Laruffa
 Collana libri Fare Fortuna, Urba Books - with Raffaele Mortelliti
 Calabresi Testadura, Urba Books - with Raffaele Mortelliti
 Calabresi Culturatori diretti, Urba Books - with Raffaele Mortelliti
 Io, Reggio e la serie A, Sportheroes - Teatro Primo edizioni

Awards 
National Award for Justice - Rosario Livatino, Section of education law and the promotion of active citizenship, 2014

References

Italian journalists
Italian male journalists
Italian bloggers
1967 births
Italian businesspeople
Living people
Male bloggers